Spilarctia javana is a moth of the family Erebidae. It was described by Walter Rothschild in 1910. It is found on Java.

References

J
Moths of Indonesia
Insects of Java
Taxa named by Walter Rothschild
Moths described in 1910